Kalamandalam Ramachandran Unnithan is a Kathakali exponent from Kerala, India. He received several awards including the Sangeet Natak Akademi Award 2016. His biography titled Kachaiyum Mizhukkum was published in 2015.

Biography
Ramachandran Unnithan was born on 1951 March 8, at Ezhukon Placott House in Kottarakkara, Kollam district to Vasu Pillai and Gomatiamma. Karithra Vasupillai taught him the basics of Kathakali. Then he studied Kathakali at Kerala Kalamandalam from 1962 to 1975 and passed the 6 year Diploma and 2 year Post Graduate Diploma. In Kalamandalam Unnithan studied Kathakali under noted Kathakali artists like Karipra Vasu Pillai, Kalamandalam Ramankutty Nair, Kalamandalam Gopi and Sadanam Krishnan Kutty. He expertise is in Thadi role in the Kathakali. In his autobiography, Unnithan recalls that one of his mentors, Sri Sadanam Krishnan Kutty, advised him to focus on role of Thadi. His most popular roles are Mannan in Lavanasuravadham (Ramayana) and Bharata Malayan in Nizhal kuth (Mahabharata). 

He lives in Vettikattiri in Thrissur district.

Family
He and his wife Sreekumari have three children.

Awards and honors
Sangeet Natak Akademi Award 2016
Kerala Sangeetha Nataka Akademi Gurupooja award 2006
HRD Fellowship
Pattikkamthodi Ravunni Menon Award
Kalamandalam Hyderali  memorial Kathakali award instituted by the Vendar Subrahmania Swamy temple advisory committee.
He has won many local awards such as awards from Kollam Kathakali Club, Kottayam Kaliyarang, Alappuzha Kathakali Club, Alappuzha Kalakshetram and Bombay Keli.

References

1951 births
Living people
20th-century Indian dancers
Dancers from Kerala
Kathakali exponents
People from Kollam district
Recipients of the Sangeet Natak Akademi Award
Malayali people
Indian male dancers